Philip Alexander Kolberg Slørdahl (born 14 November 2000) is a Norwegian footballer who plays for  Lillestrøm.

He played youth football for Frigg and Sagene, featuring for Sagene's senior team in the fifth and sixth tiers in Norway. In 2018 he joined Lillestrøm's youth setup, making his first-team, first-tier debut in 2019. He also represented Norway at the  2019 UEFA European Under-19 Championship.

References

2000 births
Living people
Footballers from Oslo
Association football defenders
Norwegian footballers
Eliteserien players
Lillestrøm SK players
Norway youth international footballers